Structural fracture mechanics is the field of structural engineering concerned with the study of load-carrying structures that includes one or several failed or damaged components. It uses methods of analytical solid mechanics, structural engineering, safety engineering, probability theory, and catastrophe theory to calculate the load and stress in the structural components and analyze the safety of a damaged structure. 

There is a direct analogy between fracture mechanics of solid and structural fracture mechanics: 

There are different causes of the first component failure: 
 mechanical overload, fatigue (material), unpredicted scenario, etc.  
 “human intervention” like unprofessional behavior or a terrorist attack.

There are two typical scenarios: 

A localized failure does NOT cause immediate collapse of the entire structure.
The entire structure fails immediately after one of its components fails.

If the structure does not collapse immediately there is a limited period of time until the catastrophic structural failure of the entire structure. There is a critical number of structural elements that defines whether the system has reserve ability or not. 

Safety engineers use the failure of the first component as an indicator and try to intervene during the given period of time to avoid the catastrophe of the entire structure. For example, “Leak-Before-Break” methodology means that a leak will be discovered prior to a catastrophic failure of the entire piping system occurring in service. It has been applied to pressure vessels, nuclear piping, gas and oil pipelines, etc.

The methods of structural fracture mechanics are used as checking calculations to estimate sensitivity of a structure to its component failure. 

The failure of a complex system with parallel redundancy can be estimated based on probabilistic properties of the system elements.

See also

References

Structural engineering
Continuum mechanics
Fracture mechanics
Solid mechanics